The Cerro Pital salamander (Bolitoglossa synoria) is a species of salamander in the family Plethodontidae.
It is found in El Salvador and Honduras.
Its natural habitats are subtropical or tropical moist montane forests and heavily degraded former forest.
It is threatened by habitat loss.

References

Bolitoglossa
Amphibians of El Salvador
Amphibians of Honduras
Critically endangered fauna of North America
Taxonomy articles created by Polbot
Amphibians described in 1999